(also frutta di Martorana or, in Sicilian) are traditional marzipan sweets, in the form of fruits and vegetables, from the provinces of Palermo and Messina, Sicily.

Realistically coloured with vegetable dyes, they are said to have originated at the Monastero della Martorana, Palermo, when nuns decorated empty fruit trees with marzipan fruit to impress an archbishop visiting at Easter. They are traditionally put by children's bedsides on All Souls' Day.

See also
 List of Sicilian dishes

References

External links
Martorana fruit  Commercial page with image

Italian confectionery
Cuisine of Sicily
Marzipan